Gemma Galli (born 13 July 1996) is an Italian synchronised swimmer.  She competed in Team at the 2020 Summer Olympics. 

Galli is an athlete of the Gruppo Sportivo della Marina Militare,

Biography
She won a bronze medal in the team free routine competition at the 2018 European Aquatics Championships.

References

1996 births
Living people
Italian synchronized swimmers
World Aquatics Championships medalists in synchronised swimming
Artistic swimmers at the 2019 World Aquatics Championships
Artistic swimmers at the 2022 World Aquatics Championships
European Aquatics Championships medalists in synchronised swimming
People from Melzo
Artistic swimmers of Marina Militare
Synchronized swimmers at the 2020 Summer Olympics
Olympic synchronized swimmers of Italy
Sportspeople from the Metropolitan City of Milan